Ville is a Finnish and Swedish male given name. Its name day is celebrated on the 6th of April. In Finland, it reached its peak of popularity in the last two decades of the 20th century.

Origin and variants

It might have originated as a variant of the name Vilho, which in turn is the Finnish form of William. The names Wille and Vili are variants of Ville.

Notable people
 Ville Haapasalo (born 1972), Finnish actor
 Ville Husso (born 1995), Finnish professional ice hockey goaltender 
 Ville Itälä (born 1959), Finnish politician
 Ville Jalasto (born 1986), Finnish professional footballer 
 Ville Koistinen (born 1982), Finnish professional ice hockey defenceman 
 Ville Laihiala (born 1973), Finnish vocalist and guitarist 
 Ville Lång (born 1985), Finnish male badminton player
 Ville Larinto (born 1990), Finnish ski jumper
 Ville Leino (born 1983), Finnish professional ice hockey forward 
 Ville Liukko (born 1974), Finnish professional tennis player
 Ville Mäntymaa (born 1985), Finnish professional ice hockey defenceman
 Ville Nieminen (born 1977), Finnish professional ice hockey forward 
 Ville Niinistö (born 1976), Finnish politician
 Ville Nousiainen (born 1983), Finnish cross country skier 
 Ville Peltonen (born 1973), Finnish professional ice hockey forward 
 Ville Pessi (1902–1983), Finnish politician 
 Ville Pokka (born 1994), Finnish professional ice hockey player 
 Ville Ritola (1896–1982), Finnish long-distance runner
 Ville Sirén (born 1964), Finnish professional ice hockey defender
 Ville Sorvali (born 1980), Finnish musician and music journalist
 Ville Tiisanoja (born 1975), Finnish shot putter
 Ville Vänni (born 1979), Finnish musician
 Ville Vainola (born 1996), Finnish professional ice hockey defenceman
 Ville Väisänen (born 1977), Finnish footballer
 Ville Vallgren (1855–1940), Finnish sculptor
 Ville Valo (born 1976), Finnish singer and songwriter 
 Ville Virtanen (actor) (born 1961), Finnish actor
 Ville Virtanen (born 1975), better known by his stage name Darude, Finnish DJ
 Ville Wallén (born 1976), Finnish footballer
 Wille Mäkelä (born 1974), Finnish curler and Olympic medalist

References

Finnish masculine given names